Brent D. Parker (born March 7, 1945) is an American former politician in the state of Utah. He is a dairy farmer from Wellsville, Utah and served in the Utah House of Representatives from 2000 to 2003, sitting as a Republican.

Parker was arrested and charged with soliciting sex from an undercover male police officer in Salt Lake City in February 2003. He pled guilty and resigned.

References

Living people
Republican Party members of the Utah House of Representatives
1945 births
Utah State University alumni
People from Cache County, Utah
Farmers from Utah
Utah politicians convicted of crimes